The 2016 Cambridge City Council election took place on 5 May 2016 to elect members of Cambridge City Council in England. This was on the same day as other nationwide local elections. The Labour Party grouping gained two seats from the Liberal Democrats, increasing their majority on the council from 6 to 10 seats.

Results summary

Ward results

Abbey

Arbury

Castle

†on 2012 election.

Cherry Hinton

Coleridge

East Chesterton

King's Hedges

Market

Newnham

Petersfield

Queen Edith's

Romsey

Trumpington

West Chesterton

References

2016 English local elections
2016
2010s in Cambridge